There is the list of American comics, by publishing company in the bellow.

A
Abstract Studio
Strangers in Paradise by Terry Moore
Echo by Terry Moore
Rachel Rising by Terry Moore
Motor Girl by Terry Moore
AC Comics

Antarctic Press

Ape Entertainment
Pocket God by Allan Dye and Dave Castelnuovo
Goblin Chronicles by Troy Dye, Tom Kelesides, and Collin Fogel
Arcana Studio
All Fall Down by Casey Jones
Archie Comics

Archaia Studios Press
Critical Millennium

B
Basement Comics

Beyond Comics
Gekido by Graig Weich & B. Wilson
Code Name: Justice by Graig Weich 
Ravedactyl by Graig Weich 
Justice by Graig Weich 
Gekido vs. Code Name: Justice by Graig Weich & B. Wilson
Blue Juice Comics
The Accelerators by RFI Porto and Gavin Smith
Aether & Empire by Mike Horan and Bong Ty Dazo
Anne Bonnie by Tim Yates

C
Cellar Door Publishing
Minister Jade
Centaur Publications

Charlton Comics

D
DC Comics

Dark Horse

Devil's Due

Dumbbell Press
Max Rep in the Age of Astrotitans

E
EC Comics

Eclipse Comics

Evil Ink Comics
Kill Audio
Evil Twin Comics
Action Philosophers!

F
Fantagraphics Books
Acme Novelty Library by Chris Ware
Eightball by Daniel Clowes
Frank by Jim Woodring
Hate by Peter Bagge
Love and Rockets by Jaime Hernandez and Gilbert Hernandez
Naughty Bits by Roberta Gregory
Palestine by Joe Sacco
Fenickx Productions LLC
Archaic
First Comics

Flat World Knowledge
 Atlas Black: Managing to Succeed

G
Gilberton Publications
Classics Illustrated

H
Harris Comics

Harvey Comics

Hermes Press

I
IDW Publishing

Image Comics

L
Laizen Comics
The Dreamhoppers
Comics Revue
Modesty Blaise Quarterly

M
Marvel Comics
Mad Cave Studios

Creator of smash hit Honor And Curse
Mirage Studios
Bade Biker & Orson by Jim Lawson
Barabbas by Dan Vado and Gino Atanasio
Bioneers by A.C. Farley
Commandosaurs by Peter Laird
Dino Island by Jim Lawson
Fugitoid by Kevin Eastman and Peter Laird
Gizmo by Michael Dooney
Gobbledygook by various artists
Grunts by various artists
Gutwallow by Dan Berger
Hallowieners: Invasion of the Halloween Hot Dogs by Ryan Brown
Hero Sandwich
Melting Pot by Kevin Eastman and Eric Talbot
Mirage Mini-Comics
Paleo by Jim Lawson
Planet Racers by Peter Laird and Jim Lawson
Plastron Cafe by various artists
Prime Slime Tails
The Puma Blues by Stephen Murphy and Michael Zulli
Rockola by Ryan Brown
Stupid Heroes by Peter Laird
Teenage Mutant Ninja Turtles and related titles by Kevin Eastman and Peter Laird
Usagi Yojimbo (volume 2) and related titles by Stan Sakai
Wild West C.O.W.-Boys of Moo Mesa by Ryan Brown
Xenotech by Michael Dooney

N
New England Comics
The Tick
Paul the Samurai
Man-Eating Cow
Chainsaw Vigilante

O
Oni Press

P
Pacific Comics

Poison Press
Cavalcade of Boys

R
Red Giant Entertainment
Amped by Bryan Augustyn
Arena: Earth
Banzai Girl 
The Blood Conspiracy
Buzzboy 
Catie & Josephine
Crow Scare
Dante
Drowtales
Duel Identity
Exposure
The First Daughter
God Mode
Greylore
Jade Warriors
Journey To Magika
Kat
Katrina
Last Blood
Legends of the Stargrazers
Lizzie
Medusa's Daughter
Midnight Piano
Modern Magic
Monster Isle by Larry Hama
Mrs. Hero
Pandora's Blogs
Porcelain
The P.S.I.C.E.T. Identity
Roboy Red
Scandals
Shadow Children
Sherwood
Shockwave Darkside
Sore Thumbs
Supernovas
Teen Angel
Tesla
Thundersaurs
TotallyTina
Warlords of Oz
Wayward Sons
Wayward Sons: Legends
WICKEDPOWERED
Renegade Comics
Holiday Out
Ms. Tree
normalman by Jim Valentino
Open Season by Jim Bricker
Wordsmith

S
Shanda Fantasy Arts
Albedo Anthropomorphics by Steve Gallacci
Shanda The Panda by Mike Curtis
Slave Labor Comics
Johnny the Homicidal Maniac by Jhonen Vasquez
Milk & Cheese by Evan Dorkin

T
Top Cow Productions

V
Valiant Comics
Archer & Armstrong
Armorines
Bloodshot
Eternal Warrior
H.A.R.D. Corps
Harbinger
Magnus, Robot Fighter
Ninjak
Psi Lords
Quantum and Woody
Rai
The Second Life of Dr. Mirage
Shadowman
Solar Man of the Atom
Turok Dinosaur Hunter
Unity
X-O Manowar
Vertigo

Virgin Comics
Zombie Broadway

W
WildStorm

Others 

Airboy by Charles Biro
Akiko by Mark Crilley
American Splendor by Harvey Pekar
Astro City by Kurt Busiek
Banimon by Boris Savic
Beyond the Veil by Rick Law
Big Bang Comics by Gary Carlson & Chris Ecker
Bone by Jeff Smith
Buster the Amazing Bear by Tommy Yune
Cavalcade of Boys by Tim Fish
Cherry Poptart by Larry Welz
Comics Revue edited by Rick Norwood
The Crow by James O'Barr
Curbside by Robert Kirby
A Distant Soil by Colleen Doran
Domino Chance by Kevin Lenagh (May 1982)
Elfquest by Wendy and Richard Pini (moved to DC Comics in 2003)
Finder by Carla Speed McNeil
Funnyman by Jerry Siegel and Joe Shuster (Magazine Enterprises 1948)
Girl Genius by Phil Foglio
Gold Digger by Fred Perry
Hepcats by Martin Wagner
It's Geek 2 Me by Francis Cleetus 
Mac Hall by Matthew Boyd
Megatokyo by Fred Gallagher and Rodney Caston
Oh Yeah! Cartoons & Comics (Nicktoons Comics anthology series)
Omaha the Cat Dancer by Reed Waller and Kate Worley
Optic Nerve by Adrian Tomine
Pakkins' Land by Gary Shipman and Rhoda Shipman
Poison Elves by Drew Hayes
Ralph Snart by Marc Hansen
Sam & Max by Steve Purcell
Starchild by James A. Owen
Teenage Mutant Ninja Turtles by Kevin Eastman and Peter Laird
Uncle Scrooge by Carl Barks
XXXenophile by Phil Foglio
Zot! by Scott McCloud

See also
List of furry comics

References

American comics titles
United States